Museumkwartier (Amsterdam) (the Museum Quarter) is a neighbourhood of Amsterdam, Netherlands, located in the borough of Amsterdam-Zuid. 

It is bordered by the Stadhouderskade, Vondelpark, Emmastraat, Reinier Vinkeleskade and the Hobbemakade. 

The area was developed following the construction of the Rijksmuseum.  

The neighbourhood gets its name from the major museums at Museumplein; the Rijksmuseum, the Stedelijk Museum and Van Gogh Museum. Other attractions in the area include the Concertgebouw and the Vondelpark.

Transport
The tram lines 2, 3, 5, 12, 16 and 24 pass through the neighbourhood.

References

Neighbourhoods of Amsterdam
Amsterdam-Zuid
Museum districts